Jye Mullane (born 29 July 1981) is an Australian former professional rugby league footballer who played in Australia for the Cronulla-Sutherland Sharks and Manly-Warringah Sea Eagles. 

In 2005 he signed with NSW Waratahs Australian Rugby Union and played domestically for Southern Districts Rebels (2006) and Northern Suburbs (2007). At this time the Australian Rugby Championship (ARC) was established nationally. Jye represented the Central Coast Rays in successfully taking out the maiden premiership. From this Jye relocated to France debuting with the successful Lézignan Sangliers 2007 premiership winning team before signing on with Beziers rugby ProD2 competition.

Mullane went onto play six seasons in France spanning both rugby league and rugby union before returning to Australia to assist his local junior club De La Salle win an A grade Final in 2013

Playing career
Mullane debuted in 2002, as a 21-year-old and played a total of 30 first grade matches spanning four years. He switched codes in 2007, playing at Northern Suburbs club rugby, Central Coast Rays (now defunct APC) before signing a one-year deal with NSW Waratahs.

In 2008, he left for France, playing for Lezignan Corbieres where he helped win their first premiership in 30 years. Joining Béziers (ASBH) rugby France in the Pro D2 in 2008. Since returning to rugby league for Lezignan 2009, he helped them remain the champions of the French Elite competition for four years in a row with two French cup titles.

References

External links
Jye Mullane player profile-Lezignan

1981 births
Living people
Australian expatriate rugby league players
Australian expatriate sportspeople in the United States
Australian rugby league players
Australian rugby union players
New Haven Warriors players
Cronulla-Sutherland Sharks players
Lézignan Sangliers players
Expatriate rugby league players in France
New South Wales Waratahs players
Rugby league five-eighths
Rugby league halfbacks
Manly Warringah Sea Eagles players
Rugby league players from Sydney